Crucianella rupestris is a species of shrub in the family Rubiaceae. They have a self-supporting growth form and simple leaves. Individuals can grow to 20 cm tall.

Sources

References 

Flora of Malta
Rubieae